The Butte Civic Center is a 7,500-seat multi-purpose arena in Butte, Montana, USA. Opened in 1952, it hosts locals sporting events and concerts as well as political events.  It was the home of the Continental Basketball Association's Butte Daredevils, who played there from their founding in 2006 until they folded in 2008. The arena's current primary tenant is the Butte Roughriders of the Northern Pacific Hockey League. In December 2007 it played host to the funeral of local hero Evel Knievel.

The arena holds;
Basketball: 6,250
Hockey/Ice Events: 5,100
Boxing: 7,000

References

Basketball venues in Montana
Buildings and structures in Butte, Montana
Tourist attractions in Butte, Montana
1952 establishments in Montana
Sports venues completed in 1952
Indoor ice hockey venues in Montana
Continental Basketball Association venues
Boxing in Montana